In the 2021 Census, the City of Calgary had a population of 1,306,784 residents, representing 30.7% of the 4,262,635 residents in all of Alberta, and 3.5% compared to a population of 36,991,981 in all of Canada. The total population of the Calgary census metropolitan area (CMA) was 1,481,806. Calgary is the largest city in Alberta, and the third-largest municipality and fifth-largest metropolitan area in Canada, as of 2021.

Civic census 
Section 57 of Alberta's Municipal Government Act (MGA) enables municipalities to conduct censuses. The City of Calgary first conducted a municipal census, or civic census, in 1931. It has conducted a civic census annually since 1958.

Calgary's 2016 civic census counted a population of 1,381,345. From 2011 to 2012, there was a 2.7% increase over its 2011 municipal census population of 1,090,936. The city attributed the 29,289 increase in residents to a natural increase of 9,631 and a net migration of 19,658 since the 2011 civic census. The 2012 civic census also recorded a total 459,339 dwellings in the city.

2012 population breakdown 
The following is a breakdown of the City of Calgary's 2012 civic census results by community, including residential communities, industrial areas, major parks and residual areas by electoral ward.

Growth and density 
Between 2016 and 2021, the population of the City of Calgary grew by 5.5%, compared with an increase of 7.8% for the Calgary CMA. During the same period, the growth rates were 10.8% for Alberta and 5.9% for Canada.

Age and gender 
In the 2011 census, the median age was 36.4 years for both the City of Calgary and its CMA. Comparatively, the median ages were 36.5 years in Alberta and 40.6 years in Canada. The largest age group was 25 to 29 years for both the city (93,360) and the CMA (100,290).

The 2011 census also indicated that 50.09% of the population was female and 49.91% was male in the city (549,360 females and 547,475 males) and 50.05% and 49.95% in the CMA (607,970 females and 606,870 males).

Ethnicity

Metro Calgary 

Note: Totals greater than 100% due to multiple origin responses.

Future projections

City of Calgary 

Note: Totals greater than 100% due to multiple origin responses.

Religion

City of Calgary

Metro Calgary

Language

Knowledge of languages

Metro Calgary 
The question on knowledge of languages allows for multiple responses. The following figures are from the 2021 Canadian Census, and lists languages that were selected by at least 1,000 respondents.

Mother tongue

Metro Calgary 
Based on Calgary's 2016 metropolitan census reporting a population of 1,381,345, English is the mother tongue for 67.8 per cent of inhabitants. French-speakers make up 1.5 per cent with 20,715 people. Other languages make up 30.7 per cent or 383,320. The top five languages outside English and French in Calgary are Tagalog (Pilipino; Filipino), Punjabi (Panjabi), Cantonese, Mandarin, and Spanish (at 8,685 or 2.1 per cent of Calgary's population).

City of Calgary

See also 
Demographics of Edmonton
Demographics of Alberta
List of neighbourhoods in Calgary

References

External links 
Alberta Municipal Affairs – Municipal Census & Population Lists
City of Calgary
Civic Census Results
Statistics Canada
2006 Census
2011 Census

Calgary
Calgary